Elasmopus arrawarra is a marine species of amphipod in the family, Maeridae, and was first described in 2006 by Lauren E. Hughes and James K. Lowry.

It is found on the New South Wales coastlines in littoral zone at up to 30 metres in depth, and lives on algae, sponges and ascidians.

References

External links
Elasmopus arrawarra occurrence data from GBIF

Crustaceans described in 2006
Taxa named by James K. Lowry
Taxa named by Lauren E. Hughes
Amphipoda